No. 1 is the debut studio album by the German Eurodisco band Silent Circle. It was released in 1986 by Blow Up in West Germany. No. 1 peaked at number 28 on the Swiss Hitparade and at number 58 on the Official German Charts.

Track listing

Charts

References

Citations

External links 

 

1986 debut albums
Silent Circle albums